The 2017 Giro d'Italia Femminile, or 2017 Giro Rosa, was the 28th running of the Giro d'Italia Femminile, the only remaining women's Grand Tour. It was held between 30 June and 9 July 2017 as the most prestigious stage race of both the 2017 UCI Women's World Tour and the women's calendar.

The race was won for the second time in three years by Olympic and European champion Anna van der Breggen from the Netherlands, who took the leader's pink jersey after the second stage and maintained the lead for the remainder of the race, taking the overall lead of the UCI Women's World Tour standings in the process. Van der Breggen triumphed in the race overall by 63 seconds from the highest-placed Italian rider Elisa Longo Borghini, of the  team.

The podium was completed by 's Annemiek van Vleuten, who was a further 36 seconds behind Longo Borghini; van Vleuten, also from the Netherlands, had the best all-around performance among the overall contenders, winning two stages and two jerseys – the points classification and also the mountains classification. Danish rider Cecilie Uttrup Ludwig extended her lead in the youth classification of the overall Women's World Tour standings by winning the race's young rider classification, while van der Breggen's  team were the winners of the team classification, after also placing defending race winner Megan Guarnier and Karol-Ann Canuel – the only other rider to wear the pink jersey, having done so after the opening stage team time trial – inside the top ten overall.

Teams
24 teams participated in the 2017 Giro d'Italia Femminile. The top 15 UCI Women's World Tour teams were automatically invited, and obliged to attend the race.

Route

The route for the 2017 Giro d'Italia Femminile was announced on 12 April 2017.

Stages

Stage 1
30 June 2017 — Aquileia to Grado, team time trial (TTT)

Stage 2
1 July 2017 — Zoppola to Montereale Valcellina,

Stage 3
2 July 2017 — San Fior to San Vendemiano,

Stage 4
3 July 2017 — Occhiobello to Occhiobello,

Stage 5
4 July 2017 — Sant'Elpidio a Mare to Sant'Elpidio a Mare, individual time trial (ITT)

Stage 6
5 July 2017 — Roseto degli Abruzzi to Roseto degli Abruzzi,

Stage 7
6 July 2017 — Isernia to Baronissi,

Stage 8
7 July 2017 — Baronissi to Palinuro,

Stage 9
8 July 2017 — Palinuro to Polla,

Stage 10
9 July 2017 — Torre del Greco to Torre del Greco,

Classification leadership table
In the 2017 Giro d'Italia Femminile, five different jerseys were awarded. The most important was the general classification, which was calculated by adding each cyclist's finishing times on each stage. Time bonuses were awarded to the first three finishers on all stages with the exception of the time trials: the stage winner won a ten-second bonus, with six and four seconds for the second and third riders respectively. Bonus seconds were also awarded to the first three riders at intermediate sprints; three seconds for the winner of the sprint, two seconds for the rider in second and one second for the rider in third. The rider with the least accumulated time is the race leader, identified by a pink jersey. This classification was considered the most important of the 2017 Giro d'Italia Femminile, and the winner of the classification was considered the winner of the race.

Additionally, there was a points classification, which awarded a cyclamen jersey. In the points classification, cyclists received points for finishing in the top 10 in a stage, and unlike in the points classification in the Tour de France, the winners of all stages – with the exception of the team time trial, which awarded no points towards the classification – were awarded the same number of points. For winning a stage, a rider earned 15 points, with 12 for second, 10 for third, 8 for fourth, 6 for fifth with a point fewer per place down to a single point for 10th place.

There was also a mountains classification, the leadership of which was marked by a green jersey. In the mountains classification, points towards the classification were won by reaching the top of a climb before other cyclists. Each climb was categorised as either second, or third-category, with more points available for the higher-categorised climbs; however on both categories, the top five riders were awarded points. The fourth jersey represented the young rider classification, marked by a white jersey. This was decided the same way as the general classification, but only riders born on or after 1 January 1995 were eligible to be ranked in the classification.

The fifth and final jersey represented the classification for Italian riders, marked by a blue jersey. This was decided the same way as the general classification, but only riders born in Italy were eligible to be ranked in the classification. There was also a team classification, in which the times of the best three cyclists per team on each stage were added together; the leading team at the end of the race was the team with the lowest total time. The daily team leaders wore red dossards in the following stage.

See also
 2017 in women's road cycling

Notes

References

External links

2017 UCI Women's World Tour
2017
2017 in Italian sport